The French School of Kuala Lumpur (LFKL) is a French international school in Segambut, Kuala Lumpur, Malaysia. Its education levels range from kindergarten through lycée (senior high school).

The school first opened in 1962. It moved to Bukit Tunku in 1983. The main campus was along Jalan Tun Ismail, while the preschool (maternelle) was on a separate site. In 2004 the first stone of the current campus was laid. In September of the following year the current campus opened.

References

External links

 French School of Kuala Lumpur

International schools in Kuala Lumpur
Secondary schools in Kuala Lumpur
Primary schools in Malaysia
Kuala Lumpur
France–Malaysia relations